Sabinella is a genus of very small ectoparasitic sea snails,  marine gastropod mollusks or micromollusks in the Eulimidae family. This genus was first described by Monterosato in 1890.

Species
Species within the genera Sabinella include:
 Sabinella bonifaciae (F. Nordsieck, 1974)
Sabinella chathamensis Bartsch, 1917
Sabinella cysticola Koehler & Vaney, 1925
Sabinella infrapatula Murdoch & Suter, 1906
Sabinella meridionalis Bartsch, 1917
Sabinella munita Hedley, 1903
Sabinella orbignyanum Hupé, 1860
Sabinella pachya Dautzenberg & H. Fischer, 1896
Sabinella schoutanica May, 1916
Sabinella shaskyi Warén, 1992
Sabinella troglodytes Thiele, 1925
Species brought into synonymy
 Sabinella bakeri Bartsch, 1917 : synonym of Pseudosabinella bakeri (Bartsch, 1917)
 Sabinella nidorum (Pilsbry, 1956) : synonym of Sabinella troglodytes (Thiele, 1925)
 *Sabinella piriformis Brugnone, 1873; synonym of Sabinella bonifaciae (F. Nordsieck, 1974)
 Sabinella ptilocrinicola (Bartsch, 1907) : synonym of Crinolamia ptilocrinicola (Bartsch, 1909)

References

 Monterosato T. A. (di) (1890). Conchiglie della profondità del mare di Palermo. Naturalista Siciliano, Palermo, 9(6): 140-151 [1 marzo]; 9(7): 157-166 [1 aprile]; 9(8): 181-191 [1 maggio]
 Laseron, C. 1955. Revision of the New South Wales eulimoid shells. The Australian Zoologist 12(2): 83-107, pls 1-3,

External links 

Marine Species Identification Portal

Eulimidae